Janez Pišek (born 4 May 1998) is a Slovenian footballer who plays as a midfielder for Bosnian Premier League side Borac Banja Luka.

Career

Pišek made his professional debut in the Slovenian PrvaLiga for Celje on 23 May 2015 in a game against Gorica.

Notes

References

External links
 NZS profile 
 

1998 births
Living people
Slovenian footballers
Slovenia youth international footballers
Slovenia under-21 international footballers
Slovenian expatriate footballers
Association football midfielders
NK Celje players
NK Domžale players
FK Borac Banja Luka players
Slovenian PrvaLiga players

Slovenian expatriate sportspeople in Bosnia and Herzegovina
Expatriate footballers in Bosnia and Herzegovina